Group A of the 2007 Fed Cup Europe/Africa Zone Group III was one of two pools in the Europe/Africa zone of the 2007 Fed Cup. Five teams competed in a round robin competition, with the top team advanced to Group I for 2008.

Turkey vs. Liechtenstein

Egypt vs. Mauritius

Egypt vs. Azerbaijan

Liechtenstein vs. Mauritius

Turkey vs. Azerbaijan

Egypt vs. Liechtenstein

Turkey vs. Mauritius

Liechtenstein vs. Azerbaijan

Turkey vs. Egypt

Azerbaijan vs. Mauritius

  placed first in this group and thus advanced to Group II for 2008, where they placed fifth overall.

See also
Fed Cup structure

References

External links
 Fed Cup website

2007 Fed Cup Europe/Africa Zone